= Bajaha Mishran =

Village in Uttar Pradesh, India

Bajaha Mishran is a village in Prayagraj, Uttar Pradesh, India.
